Ramoní is the name of:

Ramoní (footballer, born 1929), full name Ramón Martínez Pérez, Spanish footballer
Ramoní (footballer, born 1946), full name Ramón Díaz Cruz, Spanish footballer
Ramoni Olalekan Mustapha, Nigerian politician
Marco Ramoni, Italian academic